Seohyeon-dong refers to two of the 19 dongs of Bundang-gu, Seongnam, South Korea, Seohyeon-1-dong and Seohyeon-2-dong. The total area is 8.36 km², with a population of 52,950, 32,686 in Seohyeon-1-dong (7.57 km²)[](May 2014) and 20,264 in Seohyeon-2-dong (0.79 km²)[] (May 2014). To south there is Sunae-dong, to north there is Imae-dong, to west there are Baekhyeon-dong and Pangyo-dong, to east there are Bundang-dong and Gwangju city. It includes the busiest place in Bundang, AK Plaza. Ak plaza's clock tower is the most famous meeting place in Bundang.

History
'Seohyeon' named after Don-seo-chon (Seo) and Yang-hyeon-ri (Hyeon). This area was called 'Seohyeon-ri' in 1914, and it was included in Seongnam in 1973. In 1992, it became Seohyeon-dong of Bundang.

Transportation and Roads
Bundang Line Seohyeon Station
 Gyeongbu Expressway
 Seoul Ring Expressway
 Seoul-Yongin Expressway
 Seongnam Avenue
 Yanghyun Street
 Seohyun Street
 Dolma Street

Hospitals
 Bundang Jesaeng Hospital
 Medipia
 Korean Jaseng Hospital

Apartment Complexes
 Hanyang Apartment
 Samsung/Hanshin Apartment
 Woosung Apartment
 Hyundai Apartment

Schools
 Seohyun Elementary School
 Bundang Elementary School
 Seohyun Middle School
 Seohyun High School

External links
Seohyeon-1-dong Office
Seohyeon-2-dong Office

Bundang
Neighbourhoods in South Korea